Thomas Warren Purtzer (born December 5, 1951) is an American professional golfer who has won tournaments on both the PGA Tour and the Champions Tour.

Purtzer was born in Des Moines, Iowa. He attended Arizona State University in Tempe, where he was a member of the school's golf team. He graduated in 1973 and turned pro. He followed in the footsteps of his older brother, Paul, who also played golf for Arizona State and played on the PGA Tour in the 1970s and early 1980s.

Purtzer is often described in golf literature as having the "sweetest swing in golf". He won five tournaments on the PGA Tour in three different decades, and won four times on the Champions Tour. His best finishes in major championships were 4th at the 1977 U.S. Open and T4 at the 1982 Open Championship.

Purtzer is a close friend of Major League Baseball Hall-of-Famer Robin Yount and country music star Vince Gill. He enjoys sports, music and auto racing in his spare time. Purtzer and his brother Paul operate Purtzer Performance Golf School and Academy in Phoenix, Arizona. He lives in Scottsdale, Arizona.

Professional wins (15)

PGA Tour wins (5)

PGA Tour playoff record (2–0)

Japan Golf Tour wins (1)

Other wins (4)

Other playoff record (0–1)

Champions Tour wins (4)

*Note: The 2003 SBC Classic was shortened to 36 holes due to rain.

Champions Tour playoff record (1–1)

Other senior wins (1)

*Note: The 2005 Titanium Enterprises Australian PGA Seniors Championship was shortened to 54 holes due to rain.

Results in major championships

CUT = missed the half-way cut
"T" = tied

Summary

Most consecutive cuts made – 12 (1989 Masters – 1996 Open Championship)
Longest streak of top-10s – 1 (three times)

Results in The Players Championship

CUT = missed the halfway cut
"T" indicates a tie for a place

U.S. national team appearances
Four Tours World Championship: 1991

See also 

 Spring 1975 PGA Tour Qualifying School graduates

References

External links

American male golfers
Arizona State Sun Devils men's golfers
PGA Tour golfers
PGA Tour Champions golfers
Golfers from Iowa
Golfers from Scottsdale, Arizona
Sportspeople from Des Moines, Iowa
1951 births
Living people